Playmates is a 1972 American made-for-television romantic comedy film starring Alan Alda, Connie Stevens, Barbara Feldon, Doug McClure and directed by Theodore J. Flicker. It originally aired as the ABC Movie of the Week on October 3, 1972.

Stevens called it "Bob & Carol & Ted & Alice that doesn't cop out at the key moment."

Plot
Two men start dating each other's ex-wives.

Cast
Alan Alda as Marshall Barnett
Connie Stevens as Patti Holvey
Barbara Feldon as Lois Barnett
Doug McClure as Kermit Holvey

Reception
The Los Angeles Times said it "packs a wallop".

This was a large ratings success, ranking among the 20 most viewed films on TV for a time.

References

External links

1972 television films
1972 films
1972 romantic comedy films
American romantic comedy films
ABC Movie of the Week
Adultery in films
Films directed by Theodore J. Flicker
Films scored by Jack Elliott
1970s American films